Football at the 2005 Islamic Solidarity Games was held in Saudi Arabia from April 9 to April 20, 2005.  Saudi Arabia were champions, defeating Morocco 1–0 in the final.

Participating teams
While some of the other countries used their full A national teams, other countries, such as Iran sent their B team and Algeria sent their Under-21 team to the competition.

 
  (withdrew)
 
  Iran B
 
 
 
 
 
 
  (hosts)
  (withdrew)

Squads

Final tournament

Group stage

Group A

Group B

Group C

Group D
Malaysia awarded first place by drawing of lots.

Knockout stage

Quarter-finals

Semi-finals

Bronze medal match

Gold medal match

Medalists

Statistics

Goalscorers

References

External links
 Goalzz
 RSSSF

 
2005
football
2005
2004–05 in Saudi Arabian football
2005 in Asian football
2005 in African football